Elmore Nixon (November 17, 1933 – June 1975) was an American jump blues pianist and singer. His piano playing accompanied several artists on their recordings, including Peppermint Harris, Clifton Chenier and Lightnin' Hopkins, as well as releasing a number of singles under his own name. Details of his life outside of his recording career are sketchy.

Biography
He was born in Crowley, Louisiana, United States. Little is known of his early life, although in 1939 his family relocated to Houston, Texas, where he grew up.  He remained in Houston for the rest of his life. It is presumed that he learned to play the piano whilst undergoing training to join the church.

In October 1947, at the age of 13, Nixon supplied piano accompaniment to Peppermint Nelson's recording of "Peppermith Boogie" for Gold Star Records. It was the commencement of an almost decade long, continuous career, in the recording studio for Nixon, working with a number of record labels.  He became a de facto member of Henry Hayes' Four Kings, who were also credited as Henry Hayes Orchestra and Henry Hayes Band.  Apart from Hayes and Nixon, the ensemble regularly included Carl Campbell, Milton Willis, L.C. Williams, Hubert Robinson, Ivory Lee and Hop Wilson. Nixon played predominately in a jump blues style.

Nixon's debut single release, "Foolish Love", was recorded in 1949 for the Sittin' in With record label. Further single releases occurred over the next six years for labels including Peacock, Mercury, Savoy, and Post.  His only commercial success came with the self-penned "Alabama Blues", which was later recorded by other musicians. Studio session work over the same period saw Nixon play piano accompaniment to Lester Williams, Hop Wilson, Billy Bizor and Clarence "Gatemouth" Brown.

During the mid-1960s, Nixon recorded with Clifton Chenier, on the latter's sessions for Arhoolie Records. He also supplied piano backing for Lightnin' Hopkins, when Hopkins recorded sides with Jewel Records. Apart from recording work, Nixon toured with his own band, performing largely in Texas and Louisiana. Also in the 1960s, Nixon enjoyed performing before Mexican audiences, making frequent trips across the border.

Nixon underwent major surgery in 1970, which curtailed his activities and was in poor health until he died in June 1975, in Houston, Texas, U.S. at the age of 41.

Selected discography

Singles

Compilation albums

See also
 List of blues musicians
 List of jump blues musicians

References

External links
Audio file of "Why Did You Go Last Night" by Clifton Chenier (featuring Elmore Nixon on piano)

1933 births
1975 deaths
African-American pianists
American blues pianists
American male pianists
Jump blues musicians
People from Crowley, Louisiana
Gold Star Records artists
Savoy Records artists
Mercury Records artists
20th-century American pianists
20th-century American male musicians
20th-century African-American musicians